The block Wiedemann algorithm for computing kernel vectors of a matrix over a finite field is a generalization by Don Coppersmith of an algorithm due to Doug Wiedemann.

Wiedemann's algorithm 

Let  be an  square matrix over some finite field F, let  be a random vector of length , and let . Consider the sequence of vectors  obtained by repeatedly multiplying the vector by the matrix ; let  be any other vector of length , and consider the sequence of finite-field elements 

Say . Then ; so the minimal polynomial of the matrix annihilates the sequence  and hence .

Our hope is that this sequence, which by construction annihilates , actually annihilates ; so we have .

The block Wiedemann (or Coppersmith-Wiedemann) algorithm 

The natural implementation of sparse matrix arithmetic on a computer makes it easy to compute the sequence S in parallel for a number of vectors equal to the width of a machine word – indeed, it will normally take no longer to compute for that many vectors than for one.  If you have several processors, you can compute the sequence S for a different set of random vectors in parallel on all the computers.

It turns out, by a generalization of the Berlekamp–Massey algorithm to provide a sequence of small matrices, that you can take the sequence produced for a large number of vectors and generate a kernel vector of the original large matrix.

Invariant Factor Calculation 
The block Wiedemann algorithm can be used to calculate the leading invariant factors of the matrix, ie, the largest blocks of the Frobenius normal form.

.

References 

 Wiedemann, D., "Solving sparse linear equations over finite fields," IEEE Trans. Inf. Theory IT-32, pp. 54-62, 1986.

 D. Coppersmith, Solving homogeneous linear equations over GF(2) via block Wiedemann algorithm, Math. Comp. 62 (1994), 333-350.

 Villard's 1997 research report 'A study of Coppersmith's block Wiedemann algorithm using matrix polynomials' (the cover material is in French but the content in English) is a reasonable description.

 Thomé's paper 'Subquadratic computation of vector generating polynomials and improvement of the block Wiedemann algorithm' uses a more sophisticated FFT-based algorithm for computing the vector generating polynomials, and describes a practical implementation with imax = jmax = 4 used to compute a kernel vector of a 484603×484603 matrix of entries modulo 2607−1, and hence to compute discrete logarithms in the field GF(2607).

Numerical linear algebra